Detroit Island is an island in Lake Michigan in the southern part of the town of Washington in Door County, Wisconsin, United States. The island has a land area of 2.578 km² (0.9955 sq mi, or 637.12 acres), out of which 27.6% is open to the public. The northern end of the island borders the waters of Detroit Harbor.

In 1967 there were no taxable buildings erected on the island, but after one of the four landowners began subdividing and selling lots, seasonal residences were built. Six residences were developed by 1978. The Door County Board of Supervisors, the Town of Washington, and the Detroit Island Landowners' Association opposed plans by the state Department of Natural Resources to acquire the entire island for use as a park.

It consists of five discontiguous parcels and there is no ferry access.  adjacent to two of the state park parcels are owned by the Door County Land Trust and are open to the public as part of the Detroit Harbor Nature Preserve.

The current purpose of the state park is to "maintain public access to provide opportunities for hunting, fishing, trapping, walking, wildlife watching and nature study and other compatible nature-based outdoor recreation activities." Deer, ruffed grouse, and waterfowl have been hunted on the island.

The state park includes areas mapped as "upland deciduous forest" and "open wetland/marsh".

 on the southeast side is part of the Green Bay National Wildlife Refuge.

History 
The border between Wisconsin and Michigan was originally defined as "the most usual ship channel" into Green Bay from Lake Michigan but commercial routes existed both to the north and south of the island which lead to a border dispute.  In 1936, the U.S. Supreme Court decision Wisconsin v. Michigan found that Detroit and other nearby islands were part of Wisconsin.

Gallery

Nearby islands

References

External links 
Detroit only hitch in desire to preserve islands for park by Keta Steebs, Door County Advocate, August 24, 1976
Wisconsin Will Go it alone on Traverse Island park, Door County Advocate, January 31, 1978
Islanders oppose Islands state park, Door County Advocate, Vol. 116 - No. 42, August 10, 1978
Area legislators oppose Grand Traverse Islands, Door County Advocate, January 30, 1979
Kayaker Paddles for Island Unification by Craig Sterrett, Peninsula Pulse, November 5, 2021

Islands of Door County, Wisconsin
Islands of Lake Michigan in Wisconsin
Former disputed islands